Relic Entertainment is a Canadian video game developer based in Vancouver and founded in June 1997 by Alex Garden and Luke Moloney. After its debut title Homeworld (1999), the company developed two more games, Impossible Creatures (2003) and Homeworld 2 (2003), and signed a contract with publisher THQ for an additional two games. THQ published the next five games by the company. A few months after being purchased, Relic released its first licensed title, Warhammer 40,000: Dawn of War (2004). It released two more original titles in 2006, The Outfit and Company of Heroes, before transitioning to focus on further titles and expansion packs in the Warhammer 40,000 and Company of Heroes franchises.

The studio was then renamed back to Relic Entertainment. Since joining Sega, Relic has released one more title in both the Warhammer and Company of Heroes franchises, both published by Sega, as well as Age of Empires IV. It is currently developing Company of Heroes 3, to be published by Sega.

Games

Cancelled

References

External links
 

 
Relic Entertainment